Leonard Peters (born December 26, 1981) is an American football safety and a rugby player.  He was originally signed by the New York Jets as an undrafted free agent in 2007 and was on the Chicago Bears practice squad. He played collegiately at Hawaii. Peters performed as a Polynesian dancer in his native Hawai'i, which includes twirling flaming knives. He has also represented the USA Tomahawks in rugby league.

American Football Career

College
Peters played in 50 games for the University of Hawai'i at safety, making 290 tackles, defending 20 passes, recording 7 interceptions and two sacks.

Professional
Peters was signed to the Chicago Bears practice squad on October 3, 2007.  He was released by the Bears on August 30, 2008.

Move to Rugby union
Peters has decided to move to rugby union, a sport from which American football is derived. He was selected for the US 7's for the 2009 World Games in Taiwan.  He showed well enough in the 2009 World Games to have been selected to the USA Squad for the first two legs of the 2009-10 IRB Sevens World Series to compete in Dubai and George, South Africa.  He has been able to turn his success at sevens into a selection to the United States National Rugby Union Team for the 2010 Churchill Cup.

References

External links
  Leonard Peters on IRB official Site

1981 births
Living people
Hawaii Rainbow Warriors football players
American football safeties
New York Jets players
Chicago Bears players
American rugby union players
Male rugby sevens players
American sportspeople of Samoan descent
Players of American football from American Samoa
American rugby league players
United States national rugby league team players
American Samoan rugby league players
Rugby union players that played in the NFL
People from Faga'alu